Umakant Yadav (born 3 February 1954) is an Indian politician for the Machhlishahr (Lok Sabha Constituency) in Uttar Pradesh.

External links
 Official biographical sketch in Parliament of India website

1954 births
Politicians from Azamgarh district
Living people
People from Azamgarh
India MPs 2004–2009
Bahujan Samaj Party politicians from Uttar Pradesh
Lok Sabha members from Uttar Pradesh
People from Jaunpur district